What's New may refer to:

Entertainment

Music
 What's New?, a song composed by Bob Haggart in 1939
 What's New? (album), by Sonny Rollins, 1962
 What's New (Bill Evans album), 1969
 What's New (Linda Ronstadt album), 1983
 What's New!!!, a Sonny Stitt album, 1966
 "What's New", a song by Megan Thee Stallion from Good News

Television
 What's New? (U.S. TV series), an American PBS daily children's educational program of the 1960s
 What's New (Canadian TV series), a Canadian news and current affairs television series 1972 until at least 1989

Other
 What's New with Phil & Dixie, a comic strip that appeared in Dragon magazine
 What's New (blog), a mathematical blog by Terence Tao
 What's New, a weekly science column by physicist Robert L. Park